James Calvin Hemphill (1850 - 1927) was a journalist and editor in the United States. During his career he edited various South Carolina newspapers including the Richmond Times-Dispatch.

Early life
He was born in Due West, South Carolina. His father was John L. Hemphill, a Presbyterian minister and professor at Erskine College.

Career
In 1880, after spending time in Abbeville, South Carolina, Hemphill moved to Charlotte, North Carolina and became a journalist at The News and Courier. In 1888, he became editor of the newspaper. He worked at the newspaper for 30 years. His editorials at The News and Courier often used humor to tackle heavy subjects, such as lynching, which he was against. After he left The News and Courier, he served as editor of the Richmond Times-Dispatch, the Spartanburg Journal (for five years) and The Charlotte Observer, where worked for a few months in 1912. He also worked for The New York Times.

He gave a November 7, 1903 talk about  "Scotch-Irish Presbyterianism in history" at the centennial synod of the Associate Reformed Presbyterian Church in Winnsboro, South Carolina. In 1909, he was named the first vice president of the Associated Press. Hemphill was a regular lecturer from 1909 through 1910 at Yale University. He gave the Bromley Lecture (Isaac Hill Bromley) at Yale University April 22, 1910 titled "Some Present Day Problems of the Press". In 1911 he addressed cadets at Virginia Military Institute.

Later life and legacy

In the winter of 1927, Hemphill's health began to fail. He died November 20, 1927 at his niece's house in Abbeville, South Carolina. His funeral was held at First Presbyterian Church the following day in Charlotte. His body was transported by train to Charleston, South Carolina the following day where it was buried at Magnolia Cemetery. Upon his death, he was named one of the leading editors and columnists in the American South, second next to Henry Watterson.

Legacy
A glass negative photograph of him with Wrey Woodson and Robert Ewing is part of the Library of Congress collection.

Works by J. C. Hemphill
Climate, soil, and agricultural capabilities of South Carolina and Georgia Government Printing Office 1882
A short story of the South Carolina Inter-State and West Indian Exposition
Charleston looking to the sea a story of the Coast Defense Squadron and the Cruiser Charleston
Men of mark in South Carolina; ideals of American life: a collection of biographies of leading men of the state 1907

Further reading
James Calvin Hemphill : Southern critic of Woodrow Wilson, 1911-1912 by Willard B Gatewood

References

External links

1850 births
1927 deaths
Burials in South Carolina
20th-century American newspaper editors
19th-century American newspaper editors
Editors of South Carolina newspapers
People from Abbeville County, South Carolina
19th-century Presbyterians
20th-century Presbyterians
American Presbyterians
Editors of North Carolina newspapers
The New York Times people
Associated Press people